Sir Henry Duffield Craik, 3rd Baronet, KCSI (2 January 1876 – 27 March 1955) was a member of the Indian Civil Service during the British Raj.

He was born in Kensington, London the son of Sir Henry Craik, 1st Baronet. He was educated at Eton College and Pembroke College, Oxford. He began his career in the Indian Civil Service as a settlement officer in the Punjab in 1899. He served as Chief Secretary of the Punjab between 1922 and 1927 and was made Commissioner in 1927. He succeeded his brother George to the Craik baronetcy in 1929. He became a member of the Punjab Executive Council in 1934, and that same year was appointed to the Viceroy's Executive Council. He served as Governor of the Punjab between 1938 and 1941.

Arms

References 

1876 births
1955 deaths
People educated at Eton College
Alumni of Pembroke College, Oxford
Craik, Henry Duffield, 3rd Baronet
Indian Civil Service (British India) officers
Governors of Punjab (British India)
British people in colonial India
Knights Commander of the Order of the Star of India
History of Punjab